The sixth season of My Hero Academia anime television series was produced by Bones and directed by Kenji Nagasaki (chief director) and Masahiro Mukai, following the story of the original manga series starting from the final chapter of the 26th volume. It covers the "Paranormal Liberation War" (chapters 258–306) and "Dark Hero" arcs (chapters 307–328). The first episode partially covers the rest of last season's chapter, while the rest was the remaining chapters in the arc. The season premiered on October 1, 2022 on ytv and NTV, and will run for two consecutive cours, in which it will air for 25 episodes.

The season follows the climactic battle between the Heroes with the students of U.A. High School -- including Izuku Midoriya -- and the villains of the Paranormal Liberation Front led by Tomura Shigaraki. With information gathered by Hawks, while undercover at the merged-villain group, the Heroes confront them which leads to an all-out war that could change the superhuman society. The second half of the season depicts the aftermath of the war; the Heroes continue to save civilians and capture villains while dealing with their casualties resulting from the loss of the public's trust. When All For One escapes from Tartarus and the secrets of "One For All" begin to be revealed to the public, Izuku realizes his powers make him a special target for the at-large villains and therefore his presence at school endangers his classmates. Izuku decides to leave the school in order to assist the Pro Heroes as they hunt down hundreds of villains freed by the destruction of seven different prisons.

Crunchyroll has licensed the season outside of Asia and is streaming it along with the English dub two weeks after the airing. However, the English dub of episode 129 was delayed due to inclement weather delays in the Dallas area where the series is dubbed. Medialink licensed the season in Asia-Pacific. The season premiered on Adult Swim's Toonami programming block on December 4, 2022.



Episode list

Home video release

Japanese
Toho will release the sixth season of the anime on DVD and Blu-ray in four volumes in Japan, with the first volume releasing on January 18, 2023, and the final volume set to be released on July 19, 2023.

Notes

References

My Hero Academia episode lists
2022 Japanese television seasons
2023 Japanese television seasons